Prince Mangkunagara VII of a noble house of Hadiwijayan Kaliabu was ruler of the Mangkunegaran Palace and lands in Surakarta in Central Java in Indonesia from 1916 to 1944, reigning during both World Wars. This first Scouting organization in Indonesia was established on the initiative of Sri Paduka Mangkunagara VII in 1916. Noto Soeroto served as his personal secretary.

The building in which the National Press Monument is now housed was constructed in 1918 under the orders of Mangkunegara VII, as a society building and meeting hall. It was known as Sociëteit "Sasana Soeka" and designed by Mas Abu Kasan Atmodirono.

References

Works cited

Princes of Mangkunegaran
Year of birth missing
Year of death missing
Scouting in Indonesia
Members of the Volksraad (Dutch East Indies)
People from Surakarta